Blaž may refer to:

 Blaž (given name), a masculine given name
 Blaž, Bosnia and Herzegovina, a village near Višegrad